The England national cricket team toured New Zealand in February and March 1984 and played a three-match Test series against the New Zealand national cricket team. New Zealand won the Test series 1–0, with two matches drawn.

Test series summary

First Test

Second Test

Third Test

One Day Internationals (ODIs)

England won the Rothmans Cup 2-1.

1st ODI

2nd ODI

3rd ODI

References

1984 in English cricket
1984 in New Zealand cricket
New Zealand cricket seasons from 1970–71 to 1999–2000
1983-84
International cricket competitions from 1980–81 to 1985